The "full Ginsburg" is a term used in American politics to refer to a person who appears on all five American major Sunday morning talk shows on the same day: This Week on ABC, Fox News Sunday, Face the Nation on CBS, Meet the Press on NBC, and Late Edition on CNN. State of the Union replaced Late Edition on CNN in January 2009.

The term is named for William H. Ginsburg, the lawyer for Monica Lewinsky during the sexual conduct scandal involving President Bill Clinton. Ginsburg was the first person to accomplish this feat, on February 1, 1998.

Completed full Ginsburgs

People who have completed multiple Full Ginsburgs

Variations
On September 20, 2009, President Barack Obama, to promote his health care reform proposals, did what The Politico called a "modified Full Ginsburg" when he appeared on five programs, opting for Univision's Spanish-language Al Punto to be his fifth program appearance instead of Fox News Sunday.

Obama also appeared on Monday, September 9, 2013, with reporters from each of the five networks, plus an extra sixth, to discuss possible military intervention in Syria. He appeared with CNN's Wolf Blitzer on The Situation Room, with ABC's Diane Sawyer on ABC World News, with NBC's Savannah Guthrie on NBC Nightly News,  with CBS's Scott Pelley on CBS Evening News and with Fox's Chris Wallace on Fox News's Special Report with Bret Baier, in addition to PBS's Gwen Ifill on PBS NewsHour.

The first person to appear on all six shows in the same week was former Governor of Florida Jeb Bush, who achieved the feat on March 10, 2013.

Florida Sen. Marco Rubio became the first person to appear on seven Sunday talk shows the same day, on April 14, 2013: all English-language shows listed above, plus Univision's Al Punto and Telemundo's Enfoque, both American Spanish-language shows.

Notes

References

American political neologisms
2000s neologisms
Journalism terminology